The Brothers Peak Formation is a geologic formation in British Columbia. It preserves fossils dating back to the Cretaceous period. An unnamed pachycephalosaurin is known from the formation.

See also

 List of fossiliferous stratigraphic units in British Columbia

References

 

Cretaceous British Columbia